D116 is the main state road on island of Hvar in Croatia connecting towns of Hvar, Milna, Stari Grad and Jelsa to Sućuraj and ferry ports, from where Jadrolinija ferries fly to the mainland, docking in Split and the D410 state road (from Hvar and Stari Grad) and Drvenik and the D412 state road (from Sućuraj).

The road, as well as all other state roads in Croatia, is managed and maintained by Hrvatske ceste, a state-owned company.

Traffic volume 

Traffic is regularly counted and reported by Hrvatske ceste (HC), operator of the road. Furthermore, the HC report number of vehicles using ferry lines from Split and Drvenik, connecting the D116 road to the D410 and the D412 state roads. Substantial variations between annual (AADT) and summer (ASDT) traffic volumes are attributed to the fact that the road connects a number of island resorts to the mainland.

Road junctions and populated areas

Sources

State roads in Croatia
Transport in Split-Dalmatia County
Hvar